The 1926–27 Football League season was Birmingham Football Club's 31st in the Football League and their 14th in the First Division. They finished in 17th position in the 22-team division. They also competed in the 1926–27 FA Cup, entering at the third round proper and losing to Southampton in the fourth.

Twenty-seven players made at least one appearance in nationally organised competition, and there were ten different goalscorers. Half-back George Liddell and forward George Briggs played in 43 of the 44 matches over the season, and Joe Bradford was leading scorer for the sixth successive year, with 23 goals, of which 22 came in the league.

Off the field, the club was in some turmoil regarding transfer policy. In early March 1927, three members of the board of directors resigned. The Sports Argus editorial suggested that one faction were "anxious to secure talent at almost any price" and the other "desirous with 'going slow' as its motto", and believed that "the former are now in the ascendancy and that they mean business". A few days later, Billy Beer resigned as manager. The Argus was disappointed: It was reported later that Beer had found it impossible to work with some members of the board, so had tendered his resignation, if that was thought to be in the best interests of the club, and was less than happy with the treatment he had received.

Football League First Division

League table (part)

FA Cup

Appearances and goals

Players with name struck through and marked  left the club during the playing season.

See also
Birmingham City F.C. seasons

ReferencesGeneral Matthews, Tony (1995). Birmingham City: A Complete Record. Breedon Books (Derby). .
 Matthews, Tony (2010). Birmingham City: The Complete Record. DB Publishing (Derby). .
 Source for match dates and results: "Birmingham City 1926–1927: Results". Statto Organisation. Retrieved 12 May 2012.
 Source for lineups, appearances, goalscorers and attendances: Matthews (2010), Complete Record, pp. 294–95.
 Source for kit: "Birmingham City". Historical Football Kits. Retrieved 22 May 2018.Specific'

Birmingham City F.C. seasons
Birmingham